Anjar railway station is a railway station in Kutch district, Gujarat, India on the Western line of the Western Railway network.

Nearby stations

 is the nearest railway station towards , whereas Sapda is the nearest railway station towards .

Major trains

Following trains halt at Anjar railway station:

 19115/16 Sayajinagari Express
 22955/56 Kutch Express
 14321/22 Ala Hazrat Express (via Bhildi)
 14311/12 Ala Hazrat Express (via Ahmedabad)
 11091/92 Bhuj–Pune Express
 19151/52 Palanpur–Bhuj Intercity Express

References 

Railway stations in Kutch district
Ahmedabad railway division
Transport in Bhuj